Wynne Prakusya (born 26 April 1981) is a former tennis player from Indonesia.

Her first appearance in a professional tournament occurred in 1996, when she was 14 years old. She formally went professional in 1998. Over her career, she has won two WTA doubles titles, nine ITF singles titles and 17 ITF doubles titles. As a junior, her highest achievements includes reaching the 1998 Australian Open junior finals and the 1998 Wimbledon junior quarterfinals.

Her first appearance at a WTA event took place in April 1999 at the Japan Open. The first time she won a match in the WTA Tour was in the 1999 Wismilak International in Kuala Lumpur. In 2000, Prakusya began to attempt qualification for the main draws of major tournaments. She also began to appear primarily at WTA rather than ITF events. Her first win in the main draw of a major came in the 2001 Australian Open, in which she and partner Janet Lee reached round two in the women's doubles. Her first tournament win on the WTA Tour was in the doubles draw of the Stanford tournament in 2001, again with partner Janet Lee.

She and Lee also qualified for the WTA Tour Championships in Los Angeles in 2002.

She represented Indonesia at the 2004 Summer Olympics, this time partnered by Angelique Widjaja. Prakusya successfully represented Indonesia at the 2002 Asian Games, the 2005 Southeast Asian Games and the 2007 Southeast Asian Games, winning seven medals in total.

She was part of the Indonesia Fed Cup team in every year from 1996 to 2005. She was part of the 2004 team which saw Indonesia return to the Fed Cup World Group: in that year, Prakusya won 11 of her 12 Fed Cup matches.

She has been inactive on the professional tennis circuit since 2007.

WTA career finals

Doubles (2–5)

ITF finals

Singles (9–5)

Unplayed final

Doubles (17–7)

Junior Grand Slam Finals

Girls' singles (0–1)

Grand Slam performance timelines

Singles

Women's doubles

Doubles

See also
 Indonesian Chinese

External links
 
 
  Official site

1981 births
Living people
People from Surakarta
Indonesian Christians
Indonesian sportspeople of Chinese descent
Indonesian female tennis players
Asian Games medalists in tennis
Tennis players at the 2000 Summer Olympics
Tennis players at the 1998 Asian Games
Tennis players at the 2002 Asian Games
Asian Games gold medalists for Indonesia
Asian Games silver medalists for Indonesia
Asian Games bronze medalists for Indonesia
Medalists at the 1998 Asian Games
Medalists at the 2002 Asian Games
Sportspeople from Central Java
Southeast Asian Games gold medalists for Indonesia
Southeast Asian Games silver medalists for Indonesia
Southeast Asian Games bronze medalists for Indonesia
Southeast Asian Games medalists in tennis
Competitors at the 2003 Southeast Asian Games
Competitors at the 2005 Southeast Asian Games
Competitors at the 2007 Southeast Asian Games
Olympic tennis players of Indonesia